The Atapaka Ishak Nation, officially named the Atakapa Ishak Tribe of Southeast Texas and Southwest Louisiana, is a cultural heritage organization of individuals who identify as descendants of the Atakapa people. 

The Atakapa Ishak Nation is an unrecognized organization. Despite using the word nation in its name, the group is neither a federally recognized tribe nor a state-recognized tribe. Louisiana has 11 state-recognized tribes but rejected the Atakapa Ishak Nation's application for state recognition.

Organization 
In 2008, the Atakapa Ishak Nation formed the Atakapa Ishak Tribe of Southeast Texas and Southwest Louisiana, a 501(c)(3) nonprofit organization, based in Lake Charles, Louisiana.

Edward Chretien Jr. is their president and primary contact.

Petition for federal recognition 
In 2007, the Atakapas Ishak Nation of Southeast Texas and Southwest Louisiana sent a letter of intent to petition for federal recognition. They have not followed up with a petition for federal recognition, however. The group has since splintered into three factions.

See also 
 List of unrecognized tribes in the United States
 Cherokee heritage groups

References

External links
 Atapaka Ishak Nation

Cultural organizations based in Louisiana
Non-profit organizations based in Louisiana
2008 establishments in Louisiana
Unrecognized tribes in the United States